Sukkar may refer to:

Places
Sukkur, Sindh, Pakistan
Sukar, Charsadda District, Pakistan
Qalat Sukkar, Dhi Qar Governorate, Iraq

People
Elias Sukkar (born 1991), a Lebanese rugby league footballer
Josephine Sukkar, Australian business executive
Maha Sukkar, an Australian police officer 
Malak Sukkar (1930-1992), a Syrian actress
Michael Sukkar (born 1981), an Australian politician
Tony Sukkar (born 1963), a Lebanese alpine skier

See also

Succar, a surname
Sukkar banat, Arabic title of the Lebanese film Caramel 
Sugar